Stauropus sikkimensis is a moth of the family Notodontidae first described by Frederic Moore in 1865. It is found in Nepal, India, China and Taiwan.

Subspecies
Stauropus sikkimensis sikkimensis (Nepal, Himalaya: Sikkim)
Stauropus sikkimensis khasianus Rothschild, 1917
Stauropus sikkimensis lushanus Okano, 1960 (Taiwan)
Stauropus sikkimensis erdmanni Schintlmeister, 1989 (China: Yunnan, Sichuan)

References

Moths described in 1865
Notodontidae